The Mason County Courthouse is an historic courthouse building located  in Mason, Texas. Built in 1909 to 1910 at a cost of $39,786, it was designed by Georgia-born American architect Edward Columbus Hosford, who is noted for the  courthouses and other buildings that he designed in Florida, Georgia and Texas. Mutual Construction Company of Louisville, Kentucky built it of Fredericksburg granite and rusticated stone. There are gable front porticoes on all four sides, each or which is supported by four 2-story Doric columns.

The building is a contributing property in the Mason Historic District which  
was added to the National Register of Historic Places on September 17, 1974.

The courthouse was razed by an arsonist's fire on the evening of February 4, 2021. The stone exterior was all that remained following the fire. At the time of the fire, the county records had been temporarily relocated to another location to facilitate future renovations to the building.

See also

National Register of Historic Places listings in Mason County, Texas
Recorded Texas Historic Landmarks in Mason County
List of county courthouses in Texas
Glasscock County Courthouse, also designed by Hosford.

References

External links

Mason County website
Protection of Texas County Courthouses
National Register listings for Mason County, Texas
A Walking Tour of Mason's Courthouse Square
Texas Escapes - Mason County Courthouse
Nostalgiaville page on Mason, Texas

Neoclassical architecture in Texas
Courthouses on the National Register of Historic Places in Texas
Buildings and structures in Mason County, Texas
County courthouses in Texas
Edward Columbus Hosford buildings
Government buildings completed in 1910
Clock towers in Texas
Historic district contributing properties in Texas
National Register of Historic Places in Mason County, Texas
1910 establishments in Texas